Peeter Järve (11 March 1874 Laatre Parish (now Mulgi Parish), Kreis Wolmar – 20 June 1936 Laatre Parish, Valga County) was an Estonian politician. He was a member of II Riigikogu. He was a member of the Riigikogu since 24 April 1925. He replaced Jaan Nuut.

References

1874 births
1936 deaths
People from Mulgi Parish
people from Kreis Wolmar
Farmers' Assemblies politicians
Members of the Riigikogu, 1923–1926
Members of the Riigikogu, 1926–1929
Members of the Riigikogu, 1929–1932